"JLApe: Gorilla Warfare!" is a DC Comics crossover event published in the various DC annuals in 1999, one of many DC crossover stories.

Synopsis
The apes of Gorilla City have declared open hostility on the rest of the world; using technology that can turn humanoids into apes. The JLA save for Batman are transformed and must deal with both this and the resulting crises. For example, when the people of Atlantis are hit, various powers try the ape-like role of gaining domination by defeating the current alpha male, namely Aquaman.

Titles
Legends of the DC Universe #19 (Primate Prelude)
JLA Annual #3
Batman Annual #23
Aquaman Annual #5
Wonder Woman Annual #8
Flash Annual #12
Superman Annual #11
Green Lantern Annual #8
Martian Manhunter Annual #2

See also
Marvel Apes
Gorillas in comics

References

1999 comics debuts
Gorilla characters in comics